Season 1975–76 was the 92nd football season in which Dumbarton competed at a Scottish national level, entering the Scottish Football League for the 70th time, the Scottish Cup for the 81st time and the Scottish League Cup for the 29th time.

Overview 
Following league reconstruction, Dumbarton started off in the new Division 1 (second tier) of Scottish league football with a real expectation that promotion to the Premier League could be achieved.  However, the departure of Willie Wallace to Australia towards the end of the previous season, followed by the transfer of brothers Colin and Tom McAdam before the end of October left a hole in the squad that proved difficult to overcome.

A poor start in the league, which saw only one win taken from the first 6 fixtures (and included an astonishing 5-5 home draw with East Fife), was to handicap Dumbarton's ambitions, and eventually it required an unbeaten run of 6 games at the end of the league campaign to climb up to a respectable 4th place.

It was however in the Scottish Cup where Dumbarton were to shine and after a third round win over Highland League opposition, Dumbarton were on their way to their first national cup semi-final in almost 80 years having disposed of both the clubs who would finish above them in Division 1’s promotion places.   Hearts provided the opposition at Hampden and, after a hard fought 0-0 draw in which Dumbarton had the better chances, they were unable to recover from the loss of an early deflected own goal and the Premier League side eventually headed into Europe as defeated Cup Finalists.

In the League Cup, Dumbarton was handed the toughest of qualifying groups, being up against 3 of the top Premier League sides, and it was no real surprise that there would be no further interest in this competition although a home win, over Hearts ironically, was well received.

Due to the reduction in the number of league games, a new competition was instituted for Division 1 and 2 clubs, named the Spring Cup.  Dumbarton qualified from their group with 4 wins from 6 games, and saw off Raith Rovers and Falkirk on their way to another cup semi final.  It was however to be their local rivals Clydebank who would go on to the final following a 3-1 defeat. Dumbarton had finished a long season by playing no fewer than 15 matches during a hectic 8 weeks across March and April; 1 league, 3 Scottish Cup, and 11 Spring Cup ties. In a strong second half to the season, and despite the fixture congestion, Dumbarton lost only two games in addition to those semi-final defeats in its closing 23 outings.

Locally, in the Stirlingshire Cup, Dumbarton beat Clydebank on penalties in the first round before surprisingly losing out to Stenhousemuir in the semi final.

Finally, Dumbarton undertook a mini-tour of England in the pre-season. Following a home game against Preston NE, the team travelled to play Chester and Tranmere Rovers.

Results & fixtures

Scottish First Division

Scottish Cup

Scottish League Cup

Spring Cup

Stirlingshire Cup

Pre-season and other matches

League table

Player statistics

Squad 

|}

Transfers

Players in

Players out

Reserve team
Dumbarton competed in the Combined Reserve League and in the Combined Reserve League Cup.  Reports of these games are sparse although it is known that Partick Thistle were league champions.

In the Scottish Second XI Cup, Dumbarton lost to Partick Thistle in the third round.

In the Scottish Reserve League Cup, Dumbarton failed to qualifying from their section.

Trivia
 The League Cup match against Celtic on 23 August marked Johnny Graham's 300th appearance for Dumbarton in all national competitions - the 4th Dumbarton player to achieve this accolade.
 The League match against Falkirk on 6 September marked Tom McAdam's 100th appearance for Dumbarton in all national competitions - the 71st Dumbarton player to reach this milestone.
 The League match against Airdrie on 6 December marked Laurie Williams's 200th appearance for Dumbarton in all national competitions - the 13th Dumbarton player to break the 'double century'.
 The Spring Cup match against Stenhousemuir on 20 March marked Don Watt's 100th appearance for Dumbarton in all national competitions - the 72nd Dumbarton player to reach this milestone.
 The Spring Cup match against Raith Rovers on 17 April marked John Bourke's 100th appearance for Dumbarton in all national competitions - the 73rd Dumbarton player to reach this milestone.
 The transfer fee of £40,000 for Tom McAdam's departure to Dundee United at the end of October matched the record set by Kenny Wilson three seasons earlier.
 Dumbarton broke both the goals for and goals against 'centuries' during the season. By scoring 106 goals in all games, this was the 14th time that the 'century - for' had been broken, and by conceding 103, this was the 20th time that the 'century - against' had been broken.

See also
 1975–76 in Scottish football

References

External links
Jim Brown (Dumbarton Football Club Historical Archive)
George Kane (Dumbarton Football Club Historical Archive)
Scottish Football Historical Archive

Dumbarton F.C. seasons
Scottish football clubs 1975–76 season